"If This Is It" is a song by American rock band Huey Lewis and the News. It was released as the fourth single from their number-one album Sports in 1984, and became their fifth top-ten and third consecutive number-six hit on the Billboard Hot 100. It also reached number five on the Adult Contemporary chart, and then became their first UK hit single, reaching number 39 on the UK Singles Chart. The song is written in  time signature.

Reception
Billboard called it a "guileless '50s throwback."  Cash Box called the song "doo-wop at its finest."

Music video
The music video for "If This Is It" was filmed in Santa Cruz, California, in June 1984. Huey is seen trying to reconcile with his ex-girlfriend (Janet Cross). He sees her on the beach and at an amusement park with other men, and has a flashback of a romantic night with her.  His ex's friend (Sandra Wilder) observes Huey's frustrations and feels sorry for him. After one last effort by Huey to win his ex back fails, he sits alone on the beach as the crowd fades. The ex's friend then appears, smiling at Huey, and they walk away together toward the boardwalk. The video ends with a family, who spent hours looking for an open space on the beach, finally locating one, only to be attacked by a shark underneath the sand that charges toward them.

The band appears in various scenes on the beach, one of which features them singing the chorus while buried in sand with only their heads visible. Comedian John Means appears as the Ball Toss Manager.

In an interview with the blog Noblemania, Cross recalled the challenges of playing Lewis' irritable ex-girlfriend. "Looking angry at Huey Lewis was tough," she said. "The whole filming was hilarious, one stunt after another and all the different boyfriends they gave me. When [Huey and I] were pretending to fight it was hard not to laugh."

The video was directed by Edd Griles, who also directed the band's videos for "The Heart of Rock & Roll" and "Stuck with You", as well as Cyndi Lauper's "Girls Just Want to Have Fun" and "Time After Time".

The video starts with a snippet of another Huey Lewis and the News song, "I Want a New Drug", also from the album Sports.

Chart performance

Weekly charts

Year-end charts

References

External links
 

1983 songs
1984 singles
Huey Lewis and the News songs
Songs written by Huey Lewis
Songs written by Johnny Colla
Chrysalis Records singles
Rock ballads